Grass Mountain is a  tall mountain in the Central Oregon Coast Range in the U.S. state of Oregon. Located in Benton County, it is the second highest peak in the Central Coast Range.

The Oregon Department of Forestry built   lookout tower on the summit in 1935. It was decommissioned and dismantled in 1968.

See also
 Hayden Bridge

References

Mountains of the Oregon Coast Range
Landforms of Benton County, Oregon